Jawad Rhalib (born 1965 in Morocco) is a Belgian-Moroccan filmmaker. His films, which generally tackle the themes of human rights and social realism, have been screened at numerous international film festivals and have received numerous awards.

Biography 
Rhalib was born in Morocco to Belgian-Moroccan parents. He attended the Catholic University of Louvain-La-Neuve, graduating with a degree in communications. Before launching his film career in 1997, Rhalib was a journalist.

Filmography

Feature films 

 2014: 7 rue de la Folie
 2016: Insoumise

Documentaries 

 1999: Au nom de la coca (In the Name of coke)
 2006: El Ejido, la loi du profit 
 2008: Les Damnes de la mer (The Damned of the Sea)
 2013: Le chant des tortues (The Song of Turtles)
 2016: Les hirondelles de l'amour (The Swallows of Love)
 2018: Au temps ou les Arabes dansaient (When Arabs Danced)
 2020: The Pink Revolution
 2020: Fadma: Even Ants Have Wings

External links

References 

Belgian film directors
Moroccan film directors
1965 births
Living people